Gerardo Greco (born January 13, 1966) is an Italian journalist.

Biography 
Gerardo Greco graduated from LUISS Guido Carli university in Rome. He then went on to study at the school of Radio and Television Journalism in Perugia, Italy. He debuted in the 1990s as a news reporter following breaking news and Italian affairs. His work at this time is most characterized by the Tangentopoli scandal, a large-scale criminal investigation in the early 1990s against widespread corruption and bribery in Italian administrative, political, and business circles.

In 2001, he became the first North American correspondent for RAI in New York, and shortly afterward for the TG2 network. He assisted in covering the developing stories regarding the September 11 attacks. He has reported many notable breaking news stories in North America to Italy including that of the Bush presidency, the natural disaster incurred by Hurricane Katrina and the 2006–2008 Cuban transfer of presidential duties from Fidel Castro to his brother Raul Castro.

References 
 http://www.laprimaweb.it/2009/07/30/gerardo-greco-presenta-good-morning-america-senigallia-an-31-luglio-2009/

Publications 
 Gerardo Greco "Good Morning AMERICA - Un viaggio sulle tracce del nuovo sogno americano", 2009, Sperling & Kupfer.
 Alessandra D'Asaro, Filippo Nanni, Gerardo Greco, “Sopravvivere al G8, la sfida dei ribelli al mercato mondiale", 2001, Editori Riuniti.

Sources 

1966 births
20th-century Italian journalists
Italian male journalists
Living people
Libera Università Internazionale degli Studi Sociali Guido Carli alumni
21st-century Italian journalists
20th-century Italian male writers